Sportsplex is a name used by several sports complexes or leisure centres. It may refer to:

Canada 
 Brandon Community Sportsplex, Brandon, Manitoba
 Dartmouth Sportsplex, Dartmouth, Nova Scotia
 ENMAX Centre, Lethbridge (formerly the Canada Games Sportsplex)
 Nepean Sportsplex, Ottawa

United States 
 Bellingham Sportsplex, Bellingham, Washington
 Centennial Sportsplex, Nashville, Tennessee
 Darien Sportsplex Ice Arena, Darien, Illinois
 Mecklenburg County Sportsplex, Matthews, North Carolina
 Orange Beach Sportsplex, Orange Beach, Alabama
 The Podium, Spokane, Washington
 RDV Sportsplex, Maitland, Florida
 Taylor Sportsplex, Taylor, Michigan
 Virginia Beach Sportsplex, Virginia Beach, Virginia

See also
 Sports complex